The women's 200 metres event at the 1990 Commonwealth Games was held on 29 January and 1 February at the Mount Smart Stadium in Auckland.

Medalists

Results

Heats
Qualification: First 2 of each heat (Q) and the next 3 fastest (q) qualified for the final.

Wind:Heat 1: +2.6 m/s, Heat 2: +3.2 m/s, Heat 3: +5.3 m/s

Final
Wind: +2.0 m/s

References

200
1990
1990 in women's athletics